Michael Shaw-Stewart may refer to:
 Sir Michael Shaw Stewart, 5th Baronet, Lord Lieutenant of Renfrewshire
 Sir Michael Shaw-Stewart, 6th Baronet, Scottish politician
 Sir Michael Shaw-Stewart, 7th Baronet, British politician